Colonel Robert Kearsley Dawson  (1798 – 1861) was an English surveyor and cartographer of the Corps of Royal Engineers.

Early life
Robert K. Dawson was born in 1798 in Dover. His father was Robert Dawson, a surveyor. He studied at the Royal Military Academy, Woolwich.

Career
Dawson was commissioned in the Corps of Royal Engineers as 2nd Lieutenant on 1 March 1816, and between 1819 and 1829 took part in the triangulation and mapping of Ireland and Scotland under Thomas Colby.

In 1831, he was recalled to England to survey the boundaries of the proposed Parliamentary Boroughs for the Great Reform Act, producing a series of one-inch and two-inch maps that are preserved in two volumes in the British Library.

Death
He died at Lee Grove, Blackheath, London, on 28 March 1861.

See also

References

1798 births
1861 deaths
People from Dover, Kent
Graduates of the Royal Military Academy, Woolwich
Royal Engineers officers
English surveyors
English cartographers
Ordnance Survey
19th-century English people
Companions of the Order of the Bath